LittleBigPlanet PS Vita is a puzzle platform video game developed by Double Eleven, Tarsier Studios and XDev Studio Europe for the PlayStation Vita handheld game console. It is the fourth game of the LittleBigPlanet franchise; a series of puzzle platformers centered on user-generated content. The game was announced in January 2011 along with the reveal of the PlayStation Vita console, then known as the Next Generation Portable (NGP), and the first details of the game were revealed on 6 June 2011 at the Electronic Entertainment Expo. It was released on 19 September 2012 in Europe, 20 September 2012 in Japan and Australia, and 25 September 2012 for the North American markets.

The online servers for the game have been permanently shut down in March 2021 due to attacks on the server suffered during the prior year.

Gameplay

As in previous titles in the LittleBigPlanet series, players control a character named Sackboy through a variety of worlds utilising the character's various abilities such as jumping and grabbing objects. It also features various non-platforming mini-games. Numerous multiplayer options are available. As well as up to four-player online competitive or co-op gameplay, the PlayStation Vita's multi-touch display can be used by two players for competitive games. "Pass'n'Play" is also available, enabling turn-based gameplay. The Vita's rear touchpanel is also used for pushing objects toward the player, creating platforms out of parts of the world.

Content creation
Players are able to create their own levels and share them online using the PlayStation Network. The PlayStation Vita's touch-screen display can be used to directly draw objects and platforms in the game world. As well as unique creation tools such as these, the game also includes all of the tools available in LittleBigPlanet 2 (with the exception of its downloadable content tools such as the Wormhole). However, materials and stickers/decorations from prior games are not available in the game. Costumes bought from the PlayStation Network used to customise the player's character are transferable between the PlayStation 3 and PlayStation Vita games, including LittleBigPlanet Karting, through costumes from the PSP game are not available in LittleBigPlanet PS Vita. Content can also be shared over both Wi-Fi and a 3G network.

Additional content

The PlayStation Vita version of the game has tools from previous versions of LittleBigPlanet that have been adapted to suit the Vita's control system, as well as new tools such as the Motion Recorder, the Touch Sensor, the Touch Tweaker, the Touch Cursor, the Touch Material and the Layer Tool, all of which provide players with touch controls. There are also tools used for other purposes such as the Dephysicalise Tool, the Sticker Scrubber and
a tool that makes a jelly like substance that Sackboy can pass through. Another new tool, the Memoriser, can store data between levels and play sessions.

A bonus with BioShock costumes was included to those who pre-ordered the game. The pack includes a costume of a Big Daddy and a Little Sister. A "Knights of Old" Pack was also announced, allowing to dress as a knight, dragon or a princess.

Plot
The story involves a puppeteer who is believed to control wooden puppets called "The Hollows" which are dangerous enemies of Carnivalia. They were created by him as replacements for the puppets he threw away due to being booed at a circus event. In order to stop the threat, Sackboy travels through various locations such as the Land of Odd and meets various characters who assist him in reaching the Spooky Mansion, where the Puppeteer is known to live.

When he reaches the mansion, it is discovered that the Puppeteer, named Franklin according to a tape recording, was captured by his own Hallows. After being saved by Sackboy, he reveals the Hollows were merely an unwanted creation made during an attempt to recreate his puppet friends, who are the same Creator Curators Sackboy met while aiming for the mansion. Due to growing bitterness from always being behind the scenes, he had thrown away them, and when he later tried to find them he shed a tear that made them fully alive. Franklin is ecstatic about reuniting with his now alive friends, and afterwards they laugh so hard, the Hollows revert back to their original Sackperson forms.

Reception

LittleBigPlanet PS Vita received positive reviews, garnering aggregated scores of 88/100 at Metacritic and 88.68% at GameRankings.

Justin Calvert from GameSpot called the game the best in the series so far and stated: "This is the game that your Vita has been waiting for. For months, the shiny handheld has been aching to show you what it's really capable of, and with the arrival of Little Big Planet PS Vita, it finally has an opportunity to do so." Calvert, who gave the game an 8.5 out if 10, praised the "wonderfully varied" story levels, "excellent" controls, and the "easier than ever" creation tools, but disliked tutorials for feeling incomplete.

Matt Helgeson of Game Informer wrote: "While LittleBigPlanet has clearly settled into a comfortable groove, it’s still one of the best pure platformers on the market. LittleBigPlanet PS Vita is another stellar entry on Sackboy’s impressive resume." Helgeson awarded the game an 8.75/10 and spoke well of the overall design, the graphics, the soundtrack, and the developers' ability to create a LittleBigPlanet game on par with the main games.

In his review, IGN's Greg Miller concluded: "LittleBigPlanet PS Vita is the definitive LittleBigPlanet game. It's everything you loved (or possibly didn't) from the past games boiled down into a package you can play anywhere at any time. You can collect prize bubbles while watching TV, download user-created levels at home and then play them on a plane, and sink the hours into learning create mode via 10-minute chunks at the Laundromat. Then, there's all the new stuff like touch controls, games that don't involve Sackboy, and the creation potential that could give you an endless supply of free games. Yes, the jumping is still floaty, the creation complicated and the load times a bit too long, but that doesn't stop LittleBigPlanet PS Vita from being an amazing experience."

Sophia Tong of GamesRadar commended the narration by Stephen Fry, the controls, and the story levels, saying: "LittleBigPlanet PS Vita encapsulates what the system can do, and deserves a spot in your Vita library. Running through each level (even multiple times) is a charming, creative, and incredibly rewarding experience, regardless of whether it's to beat your friend's leaderboard score or if you're simply going after every collectible for that satisfying "pop" sound. Even when you feel like you've exhausted all your minigame options, what you can create in the Imagisphere with the game's powerful toolset is only limited by your imagination."

Awards

References

External links

Official community site
Double Eleven Limited official website
Tarsier Studios official website

2012 video games
LittleBigPlanet
Puzzle video games
Platform games
PlayStation Vita games
PlayStation Vita-only games
Science fantasy video games
Sony Interactive Entertainment games
Video games developed in Sweden
Video games developed in the United Kingdom
Video games with user-generated gameplay content
Multiplayer and single-player video games
Video games scored by Kenneth Young
Video games scored by Winifred Phillips
Video games set on fictional planets
Double Eleven (company) games
Products and services discontinued in 2021
Inactive online games